Saint George of the Genoese (Italian: San Giorgio dei Genovesi) is a Renaissance-style, Roman Catholic church located near the port of La Cala, on Via Buon Pastore in the ancient quarter of the Loggia, in Palermo, region of Sicily, Italy.

History 
Before the construction of this church the Genoese community of Palermo celebrated its religious services in a chapel located in the complex of San Francesco d'Assisi. In 1576 the Genoese bought the little church of San Luca and the surrounding land, located near the port. They demolished the old church and planned the construction of a new temple dedicated to their patron, Saint George.

The architectural project was produced by Giorgio Di Faccio with the assistance of Battista Carabbio. The construction of the church was the result of the new financial balance of power of the city. In fact, the Genoeses overtook the Pisans in the context of banking in the Kingdom of Sicily. Many rich Genoese families contributed to the construction. The church was completed in 1596.

The church hosts the burial of the famous female painter Sofonisba Anguissola.

The church now lies at the edge of the urban settlement, cornered by the interstate highway and Via Cavour. To the north are is the dilapidated monument to the Obelisk for the 13 Victims dedicated to the revolutionaries shot near here by Bourbon authorities a month prior to the liberation by Garibaldi.

Art

Paintings 
Oil on canvas:
 Annunciation, Luca Giordano
 Our Lady of the Rosary and Saints, Luca Giordano
 Baptism of Jesus, Palma il Giovane
 Martyrdom of Saint George, Palma il Giovane
 Ecstasy of Saint Francis of Assisi, Gerardo Astorino
 Stoning of Saint Stephen the Protomartyr, Bernardo Castello
 Martyrdom of Saint Vincent of Saragossa, Jacopo da Empoli
 Our Lady Queen of Genoa, Domenico Fiasella
 Saint Luke depicting the Virgin, Filippo Paladini
 Saint George and the Dragon, unknown author

See also 

 Loggia
 La Cala

References

External links 
  Image gallery
  Profile of the church - arte.it
  History of the church - Provincia Regionale di Palermo
  Image gallery and history of the church - ilgeniodipalermo.com

Giorgio Genovesi
Renaissance architecture in Palermo
16th-century Roman Catholic church buildings in Italy